Mood Swings is a 1993 album by the Canadian hard rock band Harem Scarem. A music video was shot for the song "No Justice". The album charted at No. 85 on the Canadian charts.

Track listing

Charts

Album

Singles

Personnel
Band members
Harry Hess – lead vocals, guitar, keyboards, producer, engineer.
Pete Lesperance – lead guitar, backing vocals, producer.
Mike Gionet – bass, backing vocals.
Darren Smith – drums, backing vocals, lead vocals on Track 6

Additional musicians
Rob Cooper – B3 Organ

Production
Kevin Doyle – producer, engineer.
Stephen Marcussen – mastering.
Andrew MacNaughtan – photography.
Package design by Stanford Communications.

References 

1993 albums
Harem Scarem albums
Warner Music Group albums